Gurudeva is a generic address to a guru in Hinduism. 

Gurudeva or Gurudev may also refer to:
 Gurudeva (film), a 2005 film
 Gurudev (film), a 1993 Indian film
 Gurudev: On the Plateau of the Peak, a biography of Sri Sri Ravi Shankar
Gurudev Siddha Peeth, an Indian ashram

People:
R. B. Gurudev, Indian cinematographer
Gurudev Gupta (born 1920),  Indian politician

See also